Tracey DeKeyser is a Canadian retired ice hockey player and a former coach with the Wisconsin Badgers women's ice hockey program.

Biography
A native of Ashton, Ontario, DeKeyser and her husband, Darren, were married in 2008. She attended Cornell University, where she was a co-captain on the women's ice hockey team and a member of the Quill and Dagger society. In 1998, she played in Switzerland for SC Reinach Lions and helped them become Zurich Cup Tournament Champions. Later she also graduated from the University of Wisconsin-Madison in 2007. She resides in Middleton, Wisconsin.

Coaching career
DeKeyser's first coaching experience was serving in the head coaching position of the girls' hockey team at Cushing Academy in Ashburnham, Massachusetts. She joined the Badgers in 1999. During the 2009–2010 season she was appointed as interim head coach while Mark Johnson took a leave of absence in order to coach the United States women's national ice hockey team in the 2010 Winter Olympics.

Awards and honors
Four-year letterwinner, Cornell
Academic All-Ivy honoree

References

Year of birth missing (living people)
Living people
Canadian ice hockey coaches
Cornell Big Red women's ice hockey players
Cornell University alumni
Ice hockey people from Ottawa
People from Middleton, Wisconsin
Swiss Women's League players
University of Wisconsin–Madison alumni
Wisconsin Badgers women's ice hockey coaches